FAUR S.A. is an industrial engineering and manufacturing company based in Bucharest, Romania.

History
FAUR was founded by Nicolae Malaxa in 1921 under the name MALAXA. Main activities were the repairing of rolling stock, manufacturing steam locomotives, diesel locomotives, car-engines and passenger coaches, diesel engines, brake equipment, and special alloy steels. By the end of the 1930s, the Malaxa factories were one of the biggest industrial group in Southeastern Europe, and the main provider of equipment for the Romanian Railways during the period.

Nationalised in 1948, part of the company became known as 23 August Works. During Communist Romania it extended its range of manufacturing by approaching pilot projects to the most Romanian industries but also to other countries in Europe, Asia and Africa.

In 1990, the company was renamed FAUR and privatized.

Since 2004, FAUR is part of Bega Group.

Steam locomotives

Since 1920, the design and the construction of different types of railway engines began at the Domains Factories (nowadays UMC Reșița) in Reșița and Malaxa Factories in Bucharest. Due to the success of the construction of the railway engines in Reșița and Bucharest factories, Romania ceased importing railway locomotives starting with 1930. Between 1926 and 1960, a total number of 1,207 steam locomotives were built in Romania: 10 models for standard tracks and 3 models for the narrow gauge railways. From these, 797 steam locomotives were made in Reșița Factories and 410 at Malaxa Factories. In 1960 the production of steam locomotives was ceased, the Romanian industry focusing on fabrication of the diesel railway engines.

Diesel-electric and diesel-hydraulic locomotives

 List of FAUR locomotives

See also
 Malaxa car
 Căile Ferate Române, Romanian Railways
 Mareșal tank destroyer
 Renault UE Chenillette

References

External links

 (in English)
 

Locomotive manufacturers of Romania
Companies based in Bucharest
Manufacturing companies established in 1921
Romanian brands
Rolling stock manufacturers of Romania
Privatized companies in Romania
Companies listed on the Bucharest Stock Exchange
Greater Romania
1921 establishments in Romania